In axiomatic set theory, the axiom schema of predicative separation, or of restricted, or Δ0 separation, is a schema of axioms which is a restriction of the usual axiom schema of separation in Zermelo–Fraenkel set theory. 
This name Δ0 stems from the Lévy hierarchy, in analogy with the arithmetic hierarchy.

Statement
The axiom asserts only the existence of a subset of a set if that subset can be defined without reference to the entire universe of sets. 
The formal statement of this is the same as full separation schema, but with a restriction on the formulas that may be used:
For any formula φ,

provided that φ contains only bounded quantifiers and, as usual, that the variable y is not free in it. 
So all quantifiers in φ, if any, must appear in the forms 

  
  

Motivation
This restriction is necessary from a predicative point of view, since the universe of all sets contains the set being defined. If it were referenced in the definition of the set, the definition would be circular.

Theories
The axiom appears in the systems of constructive set theory CST and CZF, as well as in the system of Kripke–Platek set theory.

Finite axiomatizability
Although the schema contains one axiom for each restricted formula φ, it is possible in CZF to replace this schema with a finite number of axioms.

See also
 Constructive set theory
 Axiom schema of separation

Constructivism (mathematics)
Axioms of set theory